Marian McQuade (January 18, 1917 – September 26, 2008) was the founder of National Grandparents Day. She served on the West Virginia Commission on Aging and the Nursing Home Licensing Board.  For many years, she helped with  the Past 80 Party, which was held annually in Richwood, WV.  Jim Comstock, editor of 'The News Leader' and the West Virginia Hillbilly, originated the Past 80 Party.

McQuade was born Marian Lucille Herndon in Caperton, West Virginia on January 18, 1917. Like Mother's Day founder Anna Jarvis, she was a native West Virginian.

Campaigning in West Virginia and later nationwide to set aside a day for grandparents, in 1973 West Virginia became the first state with a special day to honor grandparents when Governor Arch Moore proclaimed May 27, 1973, Grandparents Day. In September 1978, the White House called her to inform her that President Jimmy Carter had signed a bill designating the Sunday after Labor Day as National Grandparents Day beginning in 1979. In 1989, the United States Postal Service issued a tenth anniversary commemorative envelope bearing the likeness of Marian McQuade in honor of National Grandparents Day.

She later lived in Oak Hill, West Virginia with her husband, Joe McQuade (1915–2001)—a member of Irish nobility - who preceded her in death, and remained in Oak Hill until her own death from heart failure on September 26, 2008, at the age of 91.

She was survived by her 15 children, 43 grandchildren, and 15 great-grandchildren.

References

External links
website

1917 births
2008 deaths
Activists from West Virginia
Elder rights activists
People from Fayette County, West Virginia
20th-century American women
21st-century American women